A physical symbol system (also called a formal system) takes physical patterns (symbols), combining them into structures (expressions) and manipulating them (using processes) to produce new expressions.

The physical symbol system hypothesis (PSSH) is a position in the philosophy of artificial intelligence formulated by Allen Newell and Herbert A. Simon. They wrote:

This claim implies both that human thinking is a kind of symbol manipulation (because a symbol system is necessary for intelligence) and that machines can be intelligent (because a symbol system is sufficient for intelligence).

The idea has philosophical roots in Hobbes (who claimed reasoning was "nothing more than reckoning"), Leibniz (who attempted to create a logical calculus of all human ideas),  Hume (who thought perception could be reduced to "atomic impressions") and even Kant (who analyzed all experience as controlled by formal rules). The latest version is called the computational theory of mind, associated with philosophers Hilary Putnam and Jerry Fodor.

The hypothesis has been criticized strongly by various parties, but is a core part of AI research. A common critical view is that the hypothesis seems appropriate for higher-level intelligence such as playing chess, but less appropriate for commonplace intelligence such as vision. A distinction is usually made between the kind of high level symbols that directly correspond with objects in the world, such as <dog> and <tail> and the more complex "symbols" that are present in a machine like a neural network.

Examples 
Examples of physical symbol systems include:
 Formal logic: the symbols are words like "and", "or", "not", "for all x" and so on. The expressions are statements in formal logic which can be true or false.  The processes are the rules of logical deduction.
 Algebra: the symbols are "+", "×", "x", "y", "1", "2", "3", etc. The expressions are equations. The processes are the rules of algebra, that allow one to manipulate a mathematical expression and retain its truth.
 A digital computer: the symbols are zeros and ones of computer memory, the processes are the operations of the CPU that change memory.
 Chess: the symbols are the pieces, the processes are the legal chess moves, the expressions are the positions of all the pieces on the board.

The physical symbol system hypothesis claims that both of these are also examples of physical symbol systems:
 Intelligent human thought: the symbols are encoded in our brains. The expressions are thoughts. The processes are the mental operations of thinking.
 A running artificial intelligence program: the symbols are data. The expressions are more data. The processes are programs that manipulate the data.

Arguments in favor of the physical symbol system hypothesis

Newell and Simon 
Two lines of evidence suggested to Allen Newell and Herbert A. Simon that "symbol manipulation" was the essence of both human and machine intelligence: the development of artificial intelligence programs and psychological experiments on human beings.

First, in the early decades of AI research there were a number of very successful programs that used high level symbol processing, such as Newell and Herbert A. Simon's General Problem Solver or Terry Winograd's SHRDLU. John Haugeland named this kind of AI research "Good Old Fashioned AI" or GOFAI. Expert systems and logic programming are descendants of this tradition. The success of these programs suggested that symbol processing systems could simulate any intelligent action.

And second, psychological experiments carried out at the same time found that, for difficult problems in logic, planning or any kind of "puzzle solving", people used this kind of symbol processing as well. AI researchers were able to simulate the step by step problem solving skills of people with computer programs. This collaboration and the issues it raised eventually would lead to the creation of the field of cognitive science. (This type of research was called "cognitive simulation".) This line of research suggested that human problem solving consisted primarily of the manipulation of high level symbols.

Symbols vs. signals 
In Newell and Simon's arguments, the "symbols" that the hypothesis is referring to are physical objects that represent things in the world, symbols such as <dog> that have a recognizable meaning or denotation and can be composed with other symbols to create more complex symbols.

However, it is also possible to interpret the hypothesis as referring to the simple abstract 0s and 1s in the memory of a digital computer or the stream of 0s and 1s passing through the perceptual apparatus of a robot.  These are, in some sense, symbols as well, although it is not always possible to determine exactly what the symbols are standing for. In this version of the hypothesis, no distinction is being made between "symbols" and "signals", as David Touretzky and Dean Pomerleau explain.

Under this interpretation, the physical symbol system hypothesis asserts merely that intelligence can be digitized. This is a weaker claim. Indeed, Touretzky and Pomerleau write that if symbols and signals are the same thing, then  "[s]ufficiency is a given, unless one is a dualist or some other sort of mystic, because physical symbol systems are Turing-universal." The widely accepted Church–Turing thesis holds that any Turing-universal system can simulate any conceivable process that can be digitized, given enough time and memory. Since any digital computer is Turing-universal, any digital computer can, in theory, simulate anything that can be digitized to a sufficient level of precision, including the behavior of intelligent organisms. The necessary condition of the physical symbol systems hypothesis can likewise be finessed, since we are willing to accept almost any signal as a form of "symbol" and all intelligent biological systems have signal pathways.

Criticism 

The physical symbol system hypothesis applies only to systems with high level symbols, and not to signal processing systems (as found in most robots) or neural networks and other statistical machine learning methods. The criticisms below are only directed against symbolic AI, and not at these more modern forms of AI. 

Nils Nilsson has identified four main "themes" or grounds in which the physical symbol system hypothesis has been attacked.
The "erroneous claim that the [physical symbol system hypothesis] lacks symbol grounding" which is presumed to be a requirement for general intelligent action. (Such as Brooks, below)
The common belief that AI requires non-symbolic processing (that which can be supplied by a connectionist architecture for instance). (Such as Dreyfus, below)
The common statement that the brain is simply not a computer and that "computation as it is currently understood, does not provide an appropriate model for intelligence".
And last of all that it is also believed in by some that the brain is essentially mindless, most of what takes place are chemical reactions and that human intelligent behaviour is analogous to the intelligent behaviour displayed for example by ant colonies.

Dreyfus and the primacy of unconscious skills 

Hubert Dreyfus attacked the necessary condition of the physical symbol system hypothesis, calling it "the psychological assumption" and defining it thus:
 The mind can be viewed as a device operating on bits of information according to formal rules.
Dreyfus refuted this by showing that human intelligence and expertise depended primarily on unconscious instincts rather than conscious symbolic manipulation. Experts solve problems quickly by using their intuitions, rather than step-by-step trial and error searches. Dreyfus argued that these unconscious skills would never be captured in formal rules. 

However, advances in sentient  and common sense reasoning has set forth empirical data that scholars are seriously considering in juxtaposition to "the psychological assumption".

Searle and his Chinese room 

John Searle's Chinese room argument, presented in 1980, attempted to show that a program (or any physical symbol system) could not be said to "understand" the symbols that it uses; that the symbols themselves have no meaning or semantic content, and so the machine can never be truly intelligent from symbol manipulation alone.

Brooks and the roboticists 

In the sixties and seventies, several laboratories attempted to build robots that used symbols to represent the world and plan actions (such as the Stanford Cart). These projects had limited success. In the middle eighties, Rodney Brooks of MIT was able to build robots that had superior ability to move and survive without the use of symbolic reasoning at all. Brooks (and others, such as Hans Moravec) discovered that our most basic skills of motion, survival, perception, balance and so on did not seem to require high level symbols at all, that in fact, the use of high level symbols was more complicated and less successful.

In a 1990 paper Elephants Don't Play Chess, robotics researcher Rodney Brooks took direct aim at the physical symbol system hypothesis, arguing that symbols are not always necessary since "the world is its own best model. It is always exactly up to date. It always has every detail there is to be known. The trick is to sense it appropriately and often enough."

Connectionism

Embodied philosophy 

George Lakoff, Mark Turner and others have argued that our abstract skills in areas such as mathematics, ethics and philosophy depend on unconscious skills that derive from the body, and that conscious symbol manipulation is only a small part of our intelligence.

See also 
 Artificial intelligence, situated approach
 Artificial philosophy

Notes

References 

 .
 .
 
 
 .
 
.
 .
 .
 .
 .
 .
 
 
 
 
 
 

Cognitive science
Philosophy of artificial intelligence
Formal systems
Cognitive modeling